Carlos José Ñáñez (born August 9, 1946) is an Argentinian prelate of the Roman Catholic Church. He served as Auxiliary Bishop of Córdoba from 1990 to 1995 when he was appointed Archbishop Coadjutor of Tucumán. He was Archbishop of Córdoba from 1998 to 2021.

Life 
Born in Córdoba, Ñáñez was ordained to the priesthood on July 17, 1971.

On December 12, 1990, he was appointed Auxiliary Bishop of Córdoba and titular bishop of Leye. Ñáñez received his episcopal consecration on January 24, 1991, from Cardinal Raúl Francisco Primatesta, Archbishop of Córdoba, with the Apostolic Nuncio to Argentina, Archbishop Ubaldo Calabresi, and the Bishop of Río Cuarto, Adolfo Roque Esteban Arana, as co-consecrators.

On December 20, 1995, he was appointed Archbishop Coadjutor of Tucumán, where he was installed on February 2, 1996. On November 17, 1998, he was appointed Archbishop of Córdoba, and he was installed there on March 12, 1999.

On July 22, 2014, Pope Francis appointed Ñáñez to a five-year renewable term as a member of the Pontifical Council for Promoting Christian Unity.

References

External links 
 Entry about Carlos José Ñáñez at catholic-hierarchy.org 

1946 births
20th-century Roman Catholic bishops in Argentina
21st-century Roman Catholic archbishops in Argentina
Living people
Roman Catholic archbishops of Córdoba
Roman Catholic bishops of Córdoba
Roman Catholic archbishops of Tucumán